João Aniceto Grandela Nunes (born 19 November 1995) is a Portuguese professional footballer who plays for Casa Pia A.C. as a central defender.

Club career

Benfica
Born in Setúbal, Nunes began his career with S.L. Benfica, joining the club's youth academy at the age of 9. On 6 January 2013, while still a junior, he played his first Segunda Liga match with the reserves, coming on as a late substitute in a 1–1 away draw against C.D. Santa Clara.

On 27 March 2014, Nunes renewed his contract until 2019. He scored his first goal in the second division on 20 September 2015, in a 1–0 home victory over Gil Vicente FC.

Lechia Gdańsk
On 29 August 2016, Nunes signed a three-year deal with Lechia Gdańsk of the Polish Ekstraklasa. He made his league debut on 9 September, playing the entire 1–0 win at KS Cracovia alongside compatriots Flávio Paixão and Marco Paixão.

On 2 May 2019, Nunes also started in the Polish Cup final, as the club won the tournament for the second time in its history after beating Jagiellonia Białystok.

Panathinaikos
On 23 July 2019, free agent Nunes joined Panathinaikos F.C. of the Super League Greece on a three-year contract. During his only season, he made 15 competitive appearances.

Puskás Akadémia
Nunes moved to Hungarian Nemzeti Bajnokság I side Puskás Akadémia FC on 1 July 2020.

International career
Nunes represented Portugal at the 2014 UEFA European Under-19 Championship. In 2015, he appeared in all the games as vice-captain as the under-20 team were knocked out in the quarter-finals of the FIFA U-20 World Cup by eventual finalists Brazil.

Career statistics

Club

Honours
Benfica Youth
UEFA Youth League runner-up: 2013–14

Lechia Gdańsk
Polish Cup: 2018–19

Individual
UEFA European Under-19 Championship Team of the Tournament: 2014

References

External links

1995 births
Living people
Sportspeople from Setúbal
Portuguese footballers
Association football defenders
Primeira Liga players
Liga Portugal 2 players
S.L. Benfica B players
Casa Pia A.C. players
Ekstraklasa players
Lechia Gdańsk players
Super League Greece players
Panathinaikos F.C. players
Nemzeti Bajnokság I players
Puskás Akadémia FC players
Portugal youth international footballers
Portuguese expatriate footballers
Expatriate footballers in Poland
Expatriate footballers in Greece
Expatriate footballers in Hungary
Portuguese expatriate sportspeople in Poland
Portuguese expatriate sportspeople in Greece
Portuguese expatriate sportspeople in Hungary